The Real One is the eighth and final studio album by Miami-based hip hop group 2 Live Crew. It was released on April 7, 1998 via Lil' Joe Records and, with the absence of Mr. Mixx, was produced by various producers. The album peaked at #59 on the Top R&B/Hip-Hop Albums. By the time of this album, Mr. Mixx had again left the group and shortly after the release of this album, Brother Marquis left as well.

Its single "2 Live Party" featuring KC of KC and the Sunshine Band and Freak Nasty peaked at #52 on the Hot R&B/Hip-Hop Songs and #9 on the Hot Rap Songs, and title single "The Real One" featuring Ice-T peaked at #60 on the Hot R&B/Hip-Hop Songs and #9 on the Hot Rap Songs.

Track listing

Personnel

Christopher Wong Won - performer, producer
Mark D. Ross - performer, producer
Joseph Weinberger - executive producer
Eric Timmons - performer (track 3)
Harry Wayne Casey - performer (track 3)
Jerold Dwight Ellis III - performer (track 8)
Garrick Demond Husbands - performer (track 8)
Tracy Lauren Marrow - performer (track 9)
Larry Dobson - performer (track 14)
Madball of Rufftown Mob - performer (track 21)
Uzi of Rufftown Mob - performer (track 21)
Luis Garcia - artwork
Clay "Beatmaster" Dixon - producer
Michael "Mike Fresh" McCray - producer
"Disco" Rick Taylor - producer
Darren "DJ Spin" Rudnick - producer

Charts

Album

Singles

References

External links

1998 albums
2 Live Crew albums